William Ronald Flockhart (16 June 1923 – 12 April 1962) was a British racing driver.  He participated in 14 World Championship Formula One Grands Prix, achieving one podium finish and won the 24 Hours of Le Mans sportscar race twice.

Racing career
Flockhart started competing in 1951 in a JP Formula 3 car. He purchased the famous ERA R4D from Raymond Mays and in 1953 had a very successful season, beating one of the works BRMs at Goodwood. He achieved podium finishes at Goodwood, Charterhall, Snetterton and Crystal Palace, as well as several hill climb successes.

Flockhart's best World Championship result was third place at the 1956 Italian Grand Prix in a Connaught Type B. In 1959, driving a BRM P25, he won the Lady Wigram Trophy, and qualified on pole, set fastest lap and won the non-championship Silver City Trophy.

In 1956, driving for the Scottish team Ecurie Ecosse, he won the 1956 24 Hours of Le Mans, sharing an ex-works Jaguar D-type with Ninian Sanderson.

Record flight attempts and death 
In the early 1960s the United Dominions Trust made plans to break the record for the time taken to fly from Sydney to London in order to gain publicity for its UDT Laystall racing team. A Commonwealth Aircraft Corporation-built Mustang World War Two fighter was purchased in Australia and Flockhart was engaged to make the attempt. Flockhart departed Sydney in the Mustang, registered G-ARKD, on 28 February 1961 and after several delays due to bad weather finally ended the attempt at Athens due to engine problems. Flockhart subsequently entered the London-Cardiff Air Race to be held in June that year but withdrew because G-ARKD was still in Athens. G-ARKD was abandoned and another CAC Mustang, registered VH-UWB, was bought in Australia for Flockhart to make a second attempt at the Sydney-London record. On 12 April 1962, while on a test flight in preparation for the record attempt, Flockhart crashed VH-UWB in poor weather near Kallista, Victoria, and was killed.

Racing record

Complete Formula One World Championship results
(key) (Races in bold indicate pole position; races in italics indicate fastest lap)

* Shared drive with Prince Bira

Complete 24 Hours of Le Mans results

Complete 12 Hours of Sebring results

References

External links 
 Ron Flockhart profile at The 500 Owners Association

1923 births
1962 deaths
Sportspeople from Edinburgh
Scottish Formula One drivers
Scottish racing drivers
24 Hours of Le Mans drivers
24 Hours of Le Mans winning drivers
Aviators killed in aviation accidents or incidents in Australia
Scottish aviators
BRM Formula One drivers
Connaught Formula One drivers
Team Lotus Formula One drivers
Cooper Formula One drivers
World Sportscar Championship drivers
Victims of aviation accidents or incidents in 1962
12 Hours of Reims drivers
Ecurie Ecosse drivers